Bruce Adolf H. Magnuson (February 21, 1909 – June 24, 1995) was a Canadian trade unionist and Communist leader.

Magnuson was born in the Swedish province of Värmland and grew up on his parents' farm. He immigrated to Canada in the spring of 1928 at the age of 19 and worked on farms in Saskatchewan before settling in the Lakehead district of northern Ontario in 1933 where he got involved in a bushworkers' strike led by the Lumber Workers Industrial Union of Canada.

He was hurt working in the bush and spent several months in hospital convalescing during which time he read the Communist Manifesto and other leftwing literature and decided to join the Communist Party of Canada.

Magnuson was elected  president of Local 2786 Lumber and Sawmill Workers' Union in 1940 and led the union until 1951 when Communists were purged by the parent union, the United Brotherhood of Carpenters and Joiners of America, after which Magnuson organized a breakaway union, the Canadian Union of Woodworkers In 1946, he led a strike that is credited with establishing the Lumber and Sawmill Workers Union on a broad basis in northern Ontario winning recognition of the union by lumber companies as the bargaining authority for workers in the pulpwood industry and establishing collective bargaining in the region's timber industry.

From August 1940 to August 1942, Magnuson was interned first at Camp Petawawa and later at an internment camp at Hull, Quebec as a subversive under the Defence of Canada Regulations. He and other communists were released after the Soviet Union became an ally as a result of Germany's invasion of the USSR.

Magnuson was on the founding executive of the Labor-Progressive Party in Ontario and a frequent candidate. In the 1957 federal election, Magnuson was the Labor-Progressive candidate in Port Arthur against Liberal cabinet minister C.D. Howe but withdrew a few weeks prior to the election in order to support Co-operative Commonwealth Federation candidate Douglas Fisher who went on to defeat Howe by 1,400 votes in an upset victory Magnuson had won 923 in the 1953 federal election in Port Arthur.

He became leader of the Labor-Progressive Party in Ontario following its crisis in 1956 when provincial leader Stewart Smith, former MPP J.B. Salsberg and hundreds of other party members left in the aftermath of Nikita Khrushchev's Secret Speech, the 1956 Hungarian Uprising as well as revelations about the extent of anti-Semitism in the Soviet Union under Stalin.

Magnuson led the Labor-Progressive Party in the 1959 Ontario election, and remained leader of the party as it renamed itself the Communist Party of Canada (Ontario) and contested the 1963 and 1967 provincial elections

He last ran as a Communist Party candidate in the 1984 federal election in Sudbury winning 75 votes. He remained a member of the Central Executive of the Communist Party of Canada in the mid-1980s.

He died in Toronto in 1995.

Electoral record

References

1909 births
1995 deaths
Swedish emigrants to Canada
Swedish communists
Leaders of the Communist Party of Canada (Ontario)
Canadian trade unionists
Politicians from Thunder Bay
Labor-Progressive Party candidates in the 1953 Canadian federal election
Labor-Progressive Party candidates in the 1958 Canadian federal election
Communist Party of Canada candidates in the 1965 Canadian federal election
Communist Party of Canada candidates in the 1968 Canadian federal election
Communist Party of Canada candidates in the 1984 Canadian federal election